, also known as REXS (Radiation EXperiments Satellite), was a Japanese satellite. The launch was a project of the Institute of Space and Astronautical Science of the University of Tokyo. The satellite was launched on February 19, 1972. Its objective was to conduct measurements in the magnetosphere. It failed shortly after launch; a later report concluded that the transmitter failed due to a high voltage arc.

References

See also 
 Japan Aerospace Exploration Agency (JAXA), Denpa (REXS) mission profile 

Satellites
Satellites of Japan
Spacecraft launched in 1972